Sheer Sound is a South African independent record label formed in 1994 by Damon Forbes.

History
Sheer Sound was formed in November 1994, shortly after South Africa's first democratic elections. The label was initially a home for jazz and world music and fast gained a reputation for its extensive South African and African jazz catalogue.

By the mid-1990s, a young music marketer, Damon Forbes, was getting restless with the limited vision of his industry. 

"I sunk my teeth into jazz because it carried a world music message for me; it was truly culturally representative.... I just looked at the market and I saw the economics of the people of South Africa changing, due to better access to education.... [And]the workplace was going to change; a lot more black people getting into jobs that are of medium and higher income levels.... With all that, comes the aspiration to listen to better quality music. [So] the market, in the long term, is going to increase."

With what he calls "R1 500 (just over $200) and a dream", Forbes established his own label, Sheer Sound. (Ansell 2005:269)

In 2006 two imprint labels, Seed and 2Feet Music, were formed under the Sheer Sound umbrella and has since released some of the most prolific rock and singer-songwriter music, respectively, in South Africa.

Roster

Singer-songwriter
 Farryl Purkiss
 Chris Letcher
 Nibs van der Spuy
 Shawn Phillips
 Baz Corden
 Simon van Gend

Rock
 Wonderboom
 Myepic
 Cassette (Outside of RSA only)
 Bed on Bricks
 Paul E. Flynn
 Martin Rocka and The Sick Shop
 Misled
 Pestroy
 Insek
 Libido
 Gently Scar'd
 Underbelly
 New Academics
 Lionel Bastos
 Elusion
 The Dirty Skirts
 Mann Friday
 Gonzo Republic
 eVoid
 Walt

Afropop
 Jaziel Brothers
 Lesego
 Mina Nawe
 Phinda
 Naledi

Jazz
 Jeff Maluleke
 McCoy Mrubata
 Winston Mankunku Ngozi
 Paul Hanmer
 Louis Mhlanga
 Gavin Minter
 Tony Cox
 Ernie Smith

Awards and nominations

See also
 List of record labels

External links
 Sheer Sound official site

References
 Ansell, Gwen. 2005. Soweto Blues. New York: Continuum Books. (The history of Sheer Sound taken from this book)

South African independent record labels
Record labels established in 1994
Jazz record labels
Rock record labels
World music record labels
House music record labels